Rochdale A.F.C is an English professional association football club based in Rochdale, England. The club was formed in 1907 and currently sits within League Two, the fourth tier of English football.

Rochdale managerial position is vacant, following the sacking of Robbie Stockdale. Keith Hill was the club's longest serving manager over two spells, from 2006 to 2011, and from 2013 until 2019. Jack Peart has the longest continuous tenure as manager, serving for 7 years, 5 months and 30 days in the 1920s. The club has never won any honours outside promotion (in 1969, 2010 and 2014), and they were runners up in the 1961-62 Football League Cup.

Each manager's entry includes his dates of tenure and the club's competitive record during that period, as well as any honours achieved.

Key
Table headers
 Nationality – The manager's country of birth.
 From – The year of the manager's first game for Rochdale.
 To – The year of the manager's last game for Rochdale.
 P – The number of games managed for Rochdale.
 W – The number of games won as a manager.
 D – The number of games drawn as a manager.
 L – The number of games lost as a manager.
 Win% – The total winning percentage under his management.
 Honours – The titles won while managing Rochdale.

Managers

References
http://www.soccerbase.com/teams/team.sd?team_id=2175&comp_id=3

External links

Managers
 
Rochdale